Three Rocket-class destroyers served with the Royal Navy.

As was typical for torpedo craft at the time, the Admiralty left detailed design to the builders, laying down only broad requirements.

They were armed with one 12-pounder and two torpedo tubes. They carried a complement of 53 officers and men.

In September 1913 the Admiralty re-classed all the surviving 27-knotter destroyers as A Class although this only applied to Surly as the other two ships had been sold for scrap in 1912.

See also
A-class destroyer (1913)

Notes

Bibliography

Destroyer classes
 
Ship classes of the Royal Navy